is a Japanese professional basketball player who plays for Ibaraki Robots of the B.League in Japan. He also plays for Japan men's national 3x3 team.

Awards and honors
3x3 Central Europe Tour 2019 - Chance 3x3 Tour Jindřichův Hradec Champions

Non-FIBA Events statistics 

|-
| align="left" | 2011
| align="left" | Universiade Japan
|8 || || 15.48 ||.397  || .294 ||.750  || 1.9 ||0.6  || 1.0 ||0.0  || 9.5
|-

Career statistics

Regular season 

|-
| align="left" | 2010-11
| align="left" | Hitachi
| 36 || || 29.2|| .383 || .358 || .745 || 2.1 || 1.3 || 0.6 || 0.1 ||  12.0
|-
|-
| align="left" | 2011-12
| align="left" | Hitachi
| 25 ||24 || 27.4|| .427 || .315 || .714 || 2.8 || 1.2 || 0.9 || 0.1 ||  12.3
|-
| align="left" | 2012-13
| align="left" | Hitachi
| 34 ||34 || 24.5 || .405 ||.373 || .708 || 1.7|| 1.4 || 0.6 || 0.1 || 11.5 
|-
| align="left" |  2013-14
| align="left" | Hitachi
| 48 || 12|| 19.5 || .353 || .320 || .750 || 1.7 || 1.4 || 0.5 || 0.1 ||  7.5
|-
| align="left" |  2014-15
| align="left" | Tochigi
| 53 ||2 || 8.9 || .432 || .333 || .719 || 0.6 || 0.6 || 0.2 || 0.0 ||  4.2
|-
| align="left" | 2015-16
| align="left" | Tochigi
| 38|| ||6.9 ||.393 ||.281 ||.700||0.6 || 0.2||0.||0.0 ||2.9
|-
| align="left" | 2016-17
| align="left" | Fukuoka
| 44||42||25.8 ||.396||.348 ||.759 ||3.5 || 2.2||0.8 ||0.2 ||11.7
|-
| align="left" | 2017-18
| align="left" | Fukuoka
| 31||27 ||25.5 ||.459 ||.415 ||.733 ||2.5 || 3.1||1.3 ||0.1 ||14.7
|-
| align="left" | 2018-19
| align="left" | Fukuoka
| 50||18 ||17.2 ||.334 ||.304 ||.712 ||1.9|| 1.6||0.8 ||0.1 ||6.5
|-

Playoffs 

|-
|style="text-align:left;"|2017-18
|style="text-align:left;"|Fukuoka
| 5 || 5 || 22.11 || .418 || .379 || .800 || 2.4 || 1.6 || 0.4 || 0.2|| 13.8
|-

Early cup games 

|-
|style="text-align:left;"|2018
|style="text-align:left;"|Fukuoka
| 2 || 2 || 30.09 || .417 || .250 || .750 || 5.0 || 4.5 || 2.0 || 0 || 14.5
|-

References

External links
 
 

1987 births
Living people
Altiri Chiba players
Cyberdyne Ibaraki Robots players
Japanese men's basketball players
Japan national 3x3 basketball team players
Utsunomiya Brex players
Rizing Zephyr Fukuoka players
Sportspeople from Fukuoka Prefecture
Sun Rockers Shibuya players
Shooting guards